George Erik Williams (born April 22, 1969) is an American former professional baseball catcher who played for the Oakland Athletics and San Diego Padres of Major League Baseball (MLB) in parts of four seasons spanning 1995–2000. Listed at 5' 10", 190 lb., Williams was a switch-hitter and threw right handed. He was born in La Crosse, Wisconsin.

References

External links
, or Retrosheet, or Venezuelan Winter League

1969 births
Living people
American expatriate baseball players in Canada
Arizona League Athletics players
Baseball players from Wisconsin
Edmonton Trappers players
Huntsville Stars players
Las Vegas Stars (baseball) players
Madison Muskies players
Major League Baseball catchers
MiraCosta Spartans baseball players
Modesto A's players
Navegantes del Magallanes players
American expatriate baseball players in Venezuela
New Orleans Zephyrs players
Oakland Athletics players
Pawtucket Red Sox players
Sportspeople from La Crosse, Wisconsin
Salt Lake Buzz players
San Diego Padres players
Southern Oregon A's players
UT Rio Grande Valley Vaqueros baseball players
West Michigan Whitecaps players